The 2008 United States presidential election in Maryland took place on November 4, 2008, and was part of the 2008 United States presidential election. Voters chose 10 representatives, or electors to the Electoral College, who voted for president and vice president.

Maryland was won by Democratic nominee Barack Obama by a 25.4% margin of victory. Prior to the election, all 17 news organizations considered this a state Obama would win, or otherwise considered as a safe blue state. The Old Line State has voted for the Democratic presidential candidate of every election since 1992. In 2008, Obama easily captured the state's 10 electoral votes in a landslide victory, winning 61.92% of the popular vote to Republican John McCain's 36.47%.

Primaries
 2008 Maryland Democratic presidential primary
 2008 Maryland Republican presidential primary

Campaign

Predictions 
There were 16 news organizations who made state-by-state predictions of the election. Here are their last predictions before election day:

Polling

Obama won every single pre-election poll, each by a double-digit margin of victory and at least 51% of the vote. The final 3 polls averaged Obama leading 54% to 38%.

Fundraising
John McCain raised a total of $3,439,120 in the state. Barack Obama raised $19,091,136.

Advertising and visits
Obama spent $257,582 while McCain spent nothing. Both tickets visited the state once.

Analysis

Maryland has supported the Democratic nominee in each of the last five presidential elections by an average margin of 15.4%. In 1980, it was 1 of only 6 states to vote for Democrat Jimmy Carter over Republican Ronald Reagan.  It has only supported a Republican six times since Franklin D. Roosevelt – 1948 and the Republican landslides of 1952, 1956, 1972, 1984 and 1988.

Maryland is often among the Democratic nominees' best states. In 1992, Bill Clinton fared better in Maryland than any other state except his home state of Arkansas. In 1996, Maryland was Clinton's sixth best, in 2000 Maryland ranked fourth for Al Gore and in 2004 John Kerry showed his fifth best performance in Maryland.

Republican presidential candidates typically win more counties by running up huge margins in western Maryland and the Eastern Shore. However, they are usually swamped by the heavily Democratic Baltimore-Washington, D.C. axis, which casts almost 75% of the state's vote.  The state's four largest county-level jurisdictions – Montgomery, Prince George's and Baltimore counties and the City of Baltimore — are strongly Democratic. These areas, which contain 1.5 million voters combined, make it extremely difficult for a Republican to win Maryland. Even in bad years for Democrats, a Republican usually has to run the table in the rest of the state and win either Montgomery, Prince George's or Baltimore counties to have a realistic chance of carrying the state. In 1984, for instance, Ronald Reagan only carried Maryland by crushing Walter Mondale in Baltimore County and narrowly winning Montgomery. In 1988, George H. W. Bush ran up a 42,300-vote margin in Baltimore County over Michael Dukakis – almost 85% of his statewide margin of 49,800 votes.

The 2008 election was no exception. Barack Obama won the state's 10 electoral votes in 2008 with 61.92% of the vote to John McCain's 36.47%.  Obama carried Montgomery, Prince George's, Baltimore County and Baltimore City with 71.6%, 88.9%, 56.2 and 87.2% of the vote, respectively. Obama's combined 550,000-vote margin in these four areas would have been enough to carry the state.  While McCain won more counties, the only large county he won was Anne Arundel County, home to the state capital, Annapolis.

Both of Maryland's U.S. Senators and 7 of its 8 U.S. Representatives in Congress are Democrats, and Democrats hold supermajorities in the state Senate and House of Delegates.  The state has elected only 5 Republican governors since 1900.

U.S. Representative Steny Hoyer, a Democrat who represents Maryland's 5th Congressional District, was elected as House Majority Leader for the 110th Congress of the U.S. House of Representatives and 111th Congress, serving in that post since January 2007.

While Maryland is a Democratic Party stronghold, its best known political figure is perhaps a Republican – former governor Spiro Agnew, who served as vice president under Richard Nixon. He was vice president from 1969 to 1973, when he resigned in the aftermath of revelations that he had taken bribes while he was Governor of Maryland. In late 1973, a court found Agnew guilty of violating tax laws.

In 2008, Democrats picked up a U.S. House an open seat in Maryland's 1st Congressional District as Democrat Frank M. Kratovil, Jr. defeated Republican Andy Harris by less than a 1% margin of victory.

Results

Results by county

Counties that flipped from Republican to Democratic
 Kent (largest borough: Chestertown)

By congressional district
Barack Obama carried 6 of Maryland’s 8 congressional districts. McCain carried two congressional districts, including one that was won by a Democrat.

Electors

Technically the voters of Maryland cast their ballots for electors: representatives to the Electoral College. Maryland is allocated 10 electors because it has 8 congressional districts and 2 senators. All candidates who appear on the ballot or qualify to receive write-in votes must submit a list of 10 electors, who pledge to vote for their candidate and his or her running mate. Whoever wins the majority of votes in the state is awarded all 10 electoral votes. Their chosen electors then vote for president and vice president. Although electors are pledged to their candidate and running mate, they are not obligated to vote for them. An elector who votes for someone other than his or her candidate is known as a faithless elector.

The electors of each state and the District of Columbia met on December 15, 2008, to cast their votes for president and vice president. The Electoral College itself never meets as one body. Instead the electors from each state and the District of Columbia met in their respective capitols.

The following were the members of the Electoral College from the state. All 10 were pledged to Barack Obama and Joe Biden:
Gene M. Ransom III 
Delores Kelley
Guy Guzzone 
Nathaniel Exum
Chris Reynolds
Bobby Fouche
Elizabeth Bobo
Michael Barnes
Susan Lee 
Rainier Harvey, Sr.

See also
 United States presidential elections in Maryland
 2008 United States presidential election
 2008 United States elections

References

Maryland
2008
Presidential